Tracey Forbes is a Canadian television writer and producer. She has worked on numerous Canadian and American television shows including Flashpoint, The Bridge,  Spider-Man: The New Animated Series and Buffy the Vampire Slayer.  In 2012/2013, she co-created, wrote and executive produced the TV drama series "Cracked" on CBC in Canada.

Forbes also wrote the made-for-TV movie Booky's Crush in 2009, based on the Booky novels by Bernice Thurman Hunter, and Girlfriend in a Coma based on Douglas Coupland's novel.

References
 

Canadian expatriates in the United States
Canadian television producers
Canadian women television producers
Canadian television writers
Living people
Canadian women television writers
Writers from Toronto
Year of birth missing (living people)
Canadian women screenwriters